The 1937 Kentucky Derby was the 63rd running of the Kentucky Derby. The race took place on May 8, 1937.

Full results

 Winning breeder: Samuel D. Riddle (KY)

References

1937
Kentucky Derby
Derby